The Bank of Brandywine was established on July 1, 1912 as a commercial bank with a state charter.  It was formed from what was previously known as the Southern Maryland German-American Bank.

Its offices were in Brandywine, Maryland and assets totalling $27.4M.

On March 20, 1982, it merged with  Citizens Bank and Trust Company of Maryland.

References

1912 establishments in Maryland
Banks based in Maryland
Banks established in 1912
Defunct financial services companies of the United States
German-American culture in Maryland
Defunct banks of the United States